The 2019 PSL season is the seventh season of the Philippine Super Liga (PSL) which began on February 16, 2019.

Grand Prix

Preliminary round:

|}
Playoffs:

Final standing:

Individual awards:

All-Filipino

Preliminary round:

Team standings

|}

Playoffs:

Final Standing:

Individual Awards:

Invitational

Preliminary Round:

|}

Playoffs:

Final Standing:

Individual Awards:

Super Cup
The 2019 PSL Super Cup is a three-day tournament that began on November 5, 2019. It will feature the Philippine national team, two PSL selection teams (Team Shine and Team Sparkle) and the women's team of the University of Tsukuba of Japan.

The tournament was organized as part of the Philippine national team's participation in the 2019 Southeast Asian Games. University of Tsukuba won the PSL Super Cup title by winning all of its three games.

Teams

Results

Final standing:

Beach volleyball

Women's

Playoffs:

Final standing:

Men's

Playoffs:

Final standing:

Brand ambassador
 Rachel Anne Daquis (2018 to 2019)

Broadcast partners
 5 Plus, One Sports, ESPN5.com

References

Philippine Super Liga
PSL
PSL